Commatica falcatella is a moth in the family Gelechiidae. It was described by Francis Walker in 1864. It is found in Mexico, Colombia and the Brazilian states of Amazonas and  Rio de Janeiro.

Adults are chalybeous (steel-blue) black, the forewings with two silvery costal points, one at three-fifths of the length, the other at four-fifths. The hindwings are dark cupreous.

References

Commatica
Moths described in 1864